Palma Sola is a community in the San Juan province. The Palma Sola massacre occurred here in 1962.

References 

Populated places in San Juan Province (Dominican Republic)